The European Christian Political Movement (ECPM) is the only European political party explicitly working on promoting Christian values. The party unites national parties and individuals from across Europe who share policies influenced by Christianity, largely following the ideals of Christian democracy. The member parties are generally more socially conservative and Eurosceptic.

The party was founded in November 2002 in Lakitelek, Hungary. It elected its first board in January 2005, and was registered in the Netherlands in September 2005. The first ECPM president was Peeter Võsu of the Party of Estonian Christian Democrats. The movement brings together over fifty Christian-Democratic political parties, NGOs, think-tanks and individual politicians from over twenty countries within EU and beyond. Youth movements are united in ECPYouth. The youth organisation started in 2004 and elected its first board in the summer of 2005.

All six MEPs sat with the European Conservatives and Reformists (ECR) group.

After the most recent 2019 European Parliament election, the party got 3 seats in the EP: Peter Van Dalen of the Christian Union, Bert-Jan Ruissen of the SGP, and Helmut Geuking of the Family Party of Germany. Peter Van Dalen and Helmut Geuking sit with the European People's Party Group while Bert-Jan Ruissen sits with the ECR. A fourth MEP, Cristian Terheș, member of the Christian Democratic National Peasants' Party in Romania,  joined the party in May 2020.

History

The ECPM started as a platform in November 2002 when representatives of political parties from more than 15 countries decided to examine new chances for Christian politics in Europe at the conference "For a Christian Europe" at Lakitelek, Hungary.

The ECPM started with Christian parties and organizations, regardless of their denomination. Parties from within and from outside the EU participated in those first years and made it possible to create a movement that is steadily growing from one year to the next. In 2003 the ECPM adopted eight guiding principles in the Lakitelek declaration "Values for Europe", which shaped ECPM's vision of Europe. In January 2005 in Tallinn, Estonia, the ECPM elected its first board. On 15 September 2005 ECPM was officially registered with statutes as an association under Dutch law. In 2010 ECPM was officially recognized as a European political party by the European Parliament. In 2014 ECPM took part in the European elections for the first time as a European Party. The ECPM board was chaired by MP Peter Östman from 2013 to 2016, from 2016 to 2021 by MEP Branislav Škripek  and by Valeriu Ghileţchi (former Moldovan MP) since 2021.

Foundation
Sallux is the official think-tank of ECPM.

Member parties

Full members

This table contains a list of full member parties of the ECPM.

Associate members

 European Christian Political Youth
 European Evangelical Alliance

 Christian Democratic Union of Armenia

Care for Europe

European Evangelical Alliance

 Crown Bulgaria
 Rule of Law Bulgaria

 Amical Service

 Institute for Ethics and Values

 Associazione "Cercasi un fine"
Unione per la Democrazia e la Libertà

 Rónán Mullen
 Human Dignity Alliance

 Academia pentru Integritate în Conducere (Academy for Integrity in Leadership (AIC))

 Research Institute ChristianUnion
 Stichting Crown Financial Ministries
 Stichting vormingsactiviteiten Oost-Europa
 The Schuman Centre for European Studies

Areopagus. Centru de Educaţie Creştină şi Cultură Contemporană (Areopagus. Center for Christian Studies and Contemporary Culture)
Asociaţia PRO VITA – Filiala Bucureşti (Pro-vita Association – Bucharest Branch)
 Centrul creștin pentru țigani (Christian Center for Roma)
 Asociația democratică creștină (Christian Democratic Association)
 Fundația românească pentru democrație (Romanian Foundation for Democracy)
 Asociația "Worldteach" (Worldteach Association)

 Center for Christian-Democratic Studies

Jubilee Centre

Organisation

Congresses 
The ECPM organizes two General Assemblies per year. An annual member congress is held as well where specific themes are discussed. The ECPM also organizes regional conferences and other events all over Europe.

Presidents 

 Peeter Võsu, 2005–2013
 Peter Östman, 2013–2016
 Branislav Škripek, 2016–2021
 Valeriu Ghileţchi, 2021–present

See also 

 Christian politics
 Political catholicism

References

External links
ECPM
ECPYouth
Sallux
ECR Group

 
Political parties established in 2002
Christian political organizations
Christian democratic parties in Europe
Organisations based in Utrecht (province)
Amersfoort